The King's Gold Medal for Poetry (known as Queen's Gold Medal for Poetry when the monarch is female) is awarded for a book of verse published by someone in any of the Commonwealth realms. Originally the award was open only to British subjects living in the United Kingdom, but in 1985 the scope was extended to include people from the rest of the Commonwealth realms. Recommendations to the King for the award of the Medal are made by a committee of eminent scholars and authors chaired by the Poet Laureate. In recent times, the award has been announced on the (traditional date of the) birthday of William Shakespeare, 23 April. However, Don Paterson was awarded the medal alongside the 2010 New Year Honours.

The Gold Medal for Poetry was instituted by King George V in 1933 at the suggestion of the British royal court's poet laureate, John Masefield.

The obverse of the medal bears the effigy of the King. The idea of the reverse, which was designed by Edmund Dulac, is: "Truth emerging from her well and holding in her right hand the divine flame of inspiration - Beauty is truth and Truth Beauty".  The latter part of this description recalls "Beauty is Truth, Truth Beauty", from John Keats's poem "Ode on a Grecian Urn".

Recipients
Source:
 2022: Selima Hill
 2021: Grace Nichols
 2020: David Constantine
 2019: Lorna Goodison
 2018: Simon Armitage
 2017: Paul Muldoon
 2016: Gillian Allnutt
 2015: Liz Lochhead
 2014: Imtiaz Dharker
 2013: Douglas Dunn
 2012: John Agard
 2011: Jo Shapcott
 2010: Gillian Clarke
 2009: Don Paterson
 2007: James Fenton
 2006: Fleur Adcock
 2004: Hugo Williams
 2003: U. A. Fanthorpe
 2002: Peter Porter
 2001: Michael Longley
 2000: Edwin Morgan
 1998: Les Murray
 1996: Peter Redgrove
 1992: Kathleen Raine
 1991: Judith Wright
 1990: Sorley MacLean
 1989: Allen Curnow
 1988: Derek Walcott
 1986: Norman MacCaig
 1981: D. J. Enright
 1977: Norman Nicholson
 1974: Ted Hughes
 1973: John Heath-Stubbs
 1971: Stephen Spender
 1970: Roy Fuller
 1969: Stevie Smith
 1968: Robert Graves
 1967: Charles Causley
 1965: Philip Larkin
 1964: R. S. Thomas
 1963: William Plomer
 1962: Christopher Fry
 1960: John Betjeman
 1959: Frances Cornford
 1957: Siegfried Sassoon
 1956: Edmund Blunden
 1955: Ruth Pitter
 1954: Ralph Hodgson
 1953: Arthur Waley
 1952: Andrew Young
 1940: Michael Thwaites
 1937: W. H. Auden
 1934: Laurence Whistler

See also
 English poetry
 List of Australian literary awards
 List of British literary awards
 List of Canadian awards
 List of New Zealand literary awards
 List of poetry awards
 List of years in literature
 List of years in poetry

References

British poetry awards
Commonwealth literary awards
Awards established in 1933
1933 establishments in the United Kingdom